Sab-e Agotay-e Sofla (also Romanized as Sab‘-e Āgotāy-e Soflá; also known as Sab‘-e Gatā‘, Sab‘-e Gatā’-e Soflá, Sab‘-e Goţā‘-e Soflá, and Soba‘ Geţā‘) is a village in Abdoliyeh-ye Sharqi Rural District, in the Central District of Ramshir County, Khuzestan Province, Iran. At the 2006 census, its population was 117, in 25 families.

References 

Populated places in Ramshir County